The Pas de Cheville (2038 m) (also the Col de Cheville) is a high mountain pass across the western Bernese Alps, connecting Gryon in the canton of Vaud in Switzerland and Derborence in the canton of Valais.

The pass lies between Les Diablerets in the north and Tête à Pierre Grept, Grand Muveran to the south .

See also
 List of mountain passes in Switzerland

External links 
List of Alpine passes in switzerland

Mountain passes of Switzerland
Mountain passes of the Alps
Mountain passes of Valais
Valais–Vaud border
Mountain passes of the canton of Vaud